Dmitri Vladimirovich Gavrikov (born 19 May 1994) is a former Russian football player.

Club career
He made his debut in the Russian Football National League for FC Khimik Dzerzhinsk on 30 May 2015 in a game against PFC Krylia Sovetov Samara.

References

External links
 
 Profile by Russian Professional Football League

1994 births
Place of birth missing (living people)
Living people
Russian footballers
Association football goalkeepers
FC Khimik Dzerzhinsk players